The black-chested sparrow (Peucaea humeralis) is a species of bird in the family Passerellidae that is endemic to Mexico. Its natural habitats are subtropical or tropical dry shrubland and subtropical or tropical high-altitude shrubland.

References

black-chested sparrow
Endemic birds of Mexico
black-chested sparrow
Taxonomy articles created by Polbot
Birds of the Sierra Madre del Sur
Balsas dry forests